The V (LG VX9800) is a CDMA smartphone. It was released under Verizon Wireless in 2005.

Since then, it has been replaced by the enV (VX9900), enV2 (VX9100) and enV3 (VX9200), which are much slimmer and maintain most of the features of The V, while adding a 2.0-megapixel camera and stereo Bluetooth support.

References

External links
 Verizon Wireless The V support
 LG VX9800 Product information

VX9800
Mobile phones introduced in 2005